Mike Moon may refer to:

Mike Moon (musician) (born 1968), Swedish guitarist for King Diamond
Mike Moon (politician) (born 1958), American Republican member of the Missouri House of Representatives
Mike Moon (animator), American animator who worked on House of Mouse and Foster's Home for Imaginary Friends, and founder of Moonlight

See also
Michael Moon (disambiguation)